2019 Women's Volleyball Thai-Denmark Super League was the 7th edition of the tournament. It was held at the MCC Hall of The Mall Bangkapi in Bangkok, Thailand 19–23 March 2019.

Foreign players

Pools composition

Preliminary round

Pool A

|}

|}

Pool B

|}

|}

Final round

Semifinals

|}

Final

|}

Final standing

See also 
 2019 Men's Volleyball Thai-Denmark Super League

References

Volleyball,Thai-Denmark Super League
Thai-Denmark Super League
Women's,2019